Gobiobotia brevirostris is a species of small freshwater fish in the family Cyprinidae. It is found in the Baihe and Xihe rivers in China.

References

 

Gobiobotia
Fish described in 1977